Iranian Society of Mechanical Engineers (ISME) is an organization founded in 1991 by some Iranian Mechanical engineers and professors (among them: Dr. Mahdi Bahadori Nezhad, Mr. Mohammad Bagherian) to develop and enhance Mechanical Engineering in Iranian universities and industries. It is now responsible for annual mechanical engineering conference in Iran which is held in spring.

Other activities include: Publishing technical journal and contributing with ASME,...

Board of Managers
Board of Managers since 21 March 2011:

Ali Akbar Saberi Zarghandi
Mohammad Reza Eslami
Ali Noori
Mr. Sepehry
Majid Safaraval
Ali Ghaffari
Siamak Kazemzadeh Hannani
Mahmood Saghafi

References

Mechanical engineering organizations
Science and technology in Iran
Scientific organisations based in Iran